Adventure in Pyjamas (Swedish: Äventyr i pyjamas) is a 1935 Swedish comedy film directed by Ragnar Widestedt and starring Carl Barcklind, Signe Wirff and Anne-Marie Brunius. It was shot at the Valby Studios of Nordisk Film in Copenhagen. The film's sets were designed by the Danish art director Christian Hansen.

Cast
 Carl Barcklind as 	Harry Anderberg
 Signe Wirff as 	Julia
 Anne-Marie Brunius as 	Dagny
 Nils Ohlin as 	Georg Edfeldt
 Ludde Gentzel as 	Pehrson
 Olga Hellqvist as 	Martha
 Carl-Gunnar Wingård as John Brandström
 Inga-Bodil Vetterlund as 	Signe
 Nils Leander as 	Carlo
 Eivor Engelbrektsson as 	Anna

References

Bibliography 
 Krawc, Alfred. International Directory of Cinematographers, Set- and Costume Designers in Film: Denmark, Finland, Norway, Sweden (from the beginnings to 1984). Saur, 1986.

External links 
 

1935 films
Swedish comedy films
1935 comedy films
1930s Swedish-language films
Films directed by Ragnar Widestedt
Nordisk Film films
1930s Swedish films